Grottammare is a town and comune on Italy's Adriatic coast, in the province of Ascoli Piceno, Marche region.

The town is crossed by the 43rd parallel north. Economy is mostly based on summer tourism; other sectors include food and vegetables production, mechanics, and commerce.

People
Pope Sixtus V (1521–1590), born here
Pericle Fazzini (1913–1987), artist, created the bronze sculpture La Resurrezione at Paul VI Audience Hall in Vatican City

Sister towns

 Naples, Italy
 Sal, Cape Verde
 Gjirokastër, Albania
 Itiúba, Brazil
 Sant'Agata de' Goti, Italy

See also
Riviera delle Palme (Marche)

External links
 Red Pepper, August 2004, "Local Democracy Italian style"

Coastal towns in the Marche